Steve Boardman may refer to:

 Steve Boardman (historian), Scottish medieval historian
 Steve Boardman (soccer) (born 1964), retired American soccer defender